This is a list of notable New Zealanders of Italian descent:

B
 Carlo Bergamini — sculptor

C
 Liberato Cacace — professional football player
 Russell Crowe — actor

D
 Brendon Diamanti — cricketer
 Kate De Goldi — writer
 Raf de Gregorio — professional football player

L
 Annalie Longo — soccer player

M
 Angela Marino — basketball player
 Aldo Miccio — basketball politician
 James Musa — footballer

R
 Luke Romano — rugby union player
 Paolo Rotondo — artist
 Bartolomeo Russo — fisherman, horticulturist and farmer

S
 Piri Sciascia — academic
 Josh Sole — rugby union player
 Raffaello Squarise — violinist, teacher, conductor, and composer

V
 Daniel Vettori — cricketer

W
 Carin Wilson — studio furniture maker

See Also 
Italian New Zealanders